Cyril Cross was an English actor, who is best known for playing Monsieur Chargon in A Patriotic Offering  of the first episode of the fourth series of the period drama Upstairs, Downstairs. It first aired on 14 September 1974 on ITV.

He is also known for his film appearances in The Mini-Affair (1967), Work Is a Four-Letter Word (1968), Dulcima (1971), Doomwatch (1972), Operation Daybreak (1975) and The Orchard End Murder (1980).

He was also shot down in a Lancaster Bomber over Berlin, in 1943.

References

External links
 

English male film actors
English male television actors
20th-century English male actors
Male actors from London